Carlos Imperial may refer to:
Carlos R. Imperial (1930–2010), Filipino politician
Carlos Eduardo Imperial (1935–1992), Brazilian actor

See also
 Carlos (disambiguation)
 Imperial (disambiguation)